This incomplete list lists earthquakes that had epicentres within the current borders of Bosnia and Herzegovina or otherwise had a significant impact on the country.

See also 
 List of earthquakes in Croatia
 List of earthquakes in Slovenia
 List of earthquakes in Albania

References

Further reading 
 

 
Geology of Bosnia and Herzegovina
Bosnia and Herzegovina
Earthquakes